Mākaha Valley is a census-designated place (CDP) in Honolulu County, Hawaii, United States. The population was 198 at the 2020 census.

Geography
Mākaha Valley is located at  (21.483100, -158.203946).

Demographics

As of the census of 2000, there were 1,289 people, 426 households, and 311 families residing in the CDP. The racial makeup of the CDP was 19.16% White, 2.87% African American, 0.54% Native American, 7.99% Asian, 21.64% Pacific Islander, 2.02% from other races, and 45.77% from two or more races. Hispanic or Latino of any race were 17.92% of the population.

There were 426 households, out of which 49.5% had children under the age of 18 living with them, 36.9% were married couples living together, 28.6% had a female householder with no husband present, and 26.8% were non-families. 18.1% of all households were made up of individuals, and 3.1% had someone living alone who was 65 years of age or older.  The average household size was 3.03 and the average family size was 3.38.

In the CDP the population was spread out, with 38.6% under the age of 18, 12.3% from 18 to 24, 31.8% from 25 to 44, 13.6% from 45 to 64, and 3.7% who were 65 years of age or older.  The median age was 25 years. For every 100 females there were 96.8 males.  For every 100 females age 18 and over, there were 85.2 males.

The median income for a household in the CDP was $27,446, and the median income for a family was $26,118. Males had a median income of $31,389 versus $24,063 for females. The per capita income for the CDP was $12,215.  About 32.4% of families and 36.6% of the population were below the poverty line, including 45.8% of those under age 18 and none of those age 65 or over.

References

Census-designated places in Honolulu County, Hawaii
Populated places on Oahu
Populated coastal places in Hawaii